Irving Christopher Neale (October 10, 1894 – October 28, 1932) was an American politician. He was a member of the Arkansas House of Representatives, serving from 1925 to 1932. He was a member of the Democratic party.

References

1932 deaths
1894 births
20th-century American politicians
Politicians from Fort Smith, Arkansas
Speakers of the Arkansas House of Representatives
Democratic Party members of the Arkansas House of Representatives